Luna Maya Sugeng (born 26 August 1983) is an Indonesian model, actress and presenter of Austrian descent. She started her career as an advertising and catwalk model.

Career
Luna began her career as a model. Her first acting job was a supporting role as an antagonist in the film 30 Hari Mencari Cinta (2004), for which she won praise. This was followed by a supporting role in Brownies in 2005. She has appeared in Indonesian advertising campaigns for Lux, XL and Toshiba.

She appeared in the film Cinta Silver with Rima Melati and Catherine Wilson. She also starred in Ruang, Jakarta Undercover, and Pesan Dari Surga. She received a nomination for Citra Award for Best Leading Actress at the 2006 Indonesian Film Festival. In 2008, she appeared in In the Name of Love, directed by Rudy Soedjarwo. Together with Dewi Sandra and Sandra Dewi, Luna sang on the Indonesian theme song for Euro 2008, titled "Play".

Luna has acted in the soap operas Dan, Kau Dan Aku, Ada Cinta, Rahasiaku and Anggun. She was one of the torchbearers in the 2008 Summer Olympics.

Luna collaborated with Dide Hijau Daun, vocalist of Hijau Daun on "Suara (Ku Berharap)", which became featured in Luna's film Janda Kembang.

Additionally, Luna directed an indie short film entitled Suci and The City, a music video for singer Dhea Ananda, videos of a new band called Malka, and a film, Pintu Harmonika.

In 2020, Luna was appointed as the host and judge of reality television series Indonesia's Next Top Model. The first cycle premiered on November 28, 2020 and aired until April 9, 2021.

Scandal 
In 2010, Luna's boyfriend Nazril Irham (Ariel), lead singer of Indonesian pop group Peterpan, was arrested after a pornographic video that featured Luna was posted on the internet. Ariel was sentenced to three-and-a-half years in prison in January 2011. Luna lost her contract to advertise Lux soap as a result of the scandal.
Luna and another actress who appeared in the sex tape with Ariel, Cut Tari, were both declared suspects but were not brought to trial. On 7 August 2018, South Jakarta District Court upheld the ongoing suspect status of the two women.

Discography

Studio album
 Perjalanan (2011)

Singles

Video clip

Filmography

Film

Television

Film television

TV commercials

Awards and nominations

 1999:
 No. 3 Cover Girl Aneka Yess! 1999
 2005:
 EO Avante dan E-motion Entertainment Inspiring Women Awards sector modeling category Best Face
 Nomine MTV Indonesia Movie Awards 2005 category Most Favorite Actress in film "Bangsal 13"
 Duty UN for WFP (Program Pangan Dunia) Indonesia
 2006:
 Bintang Potensial 2006 version tabloid Bintang Indonesia
 Icon Ekslusif LUX 2006
 Nomine MTV Indonesia Movie Awards 2006 category Most Favourite Actress in film "Ruang"
 Nomine Festival Film Indonesia 2006 category The main character best Woman in film "Ruang"
 2007:
 Nomine Indonesian Movie Awards 2007 category The main character best actress in film "Ruang"
 Nominasi Indonesian Movie Awards 2007 kategori Pemeran Utama Wanita Terfavorit dalam film "Ruang"
 Nominasi Festival Film Bandung 2007 kategori Lakon Utama Wanita Terpuji dalam film "Jakarta Undercover"
 Nominasi MTV Indonesia Movie Awards 2007 kategori Most Favourite Actress dalam film "Pesan Dari Surga"
 Duta Astro untuk saluran Astro Aruna 2007
 Duta Asma Indonesia 2007
 The Most Sexiest Female in Indonesia 2007 (#3 di dunia) versi majalah FHM
 Bintang Iklan Wanita Terfavorit 2007 versi responden DetEksi Jawa Pos
 2008:
 Pembawa Obor Olimpiade Beijing 2008
 Duta Besar Produk Toshiba Indonesia
 No. 5 Artis terkaya Indonesia 2008 versi majalah Globe Asia
 Duta WWF Indonesia 2008
 Nominasi Indonesia Kids Choice Awards 2008 kategori Artis Wanita Favorit
 !nsert Anniversary Awards 2008 kategori Most Sexiest Female Celebrity
 Aktris Layar Lebar Terfavorit 2008 versi responden DetEksi Jawa Pos
 Bintang Iklan Wanita Terfavorit 2008 versi responden DetEksi Jawa Pos
 The Most Beautiful Woman in Indonesia 2008 versi Stop Magazine
 2009:
 Indonesia Kids Choice Awards 2009 kategori Artis Wanita favorit
 Nominasi Indonesia Kids Choice Awards 2009 kategori Pembawa Acara Favorit
 Nominasi Panasonic Awards 2009 kategori Aktris Terfavorit
 Nominasi Panasonic Awards 2009 kategori Presenter Musik Variety Show terfavorit
 !nsert Anniversary Award 2009 kategori We Love to Hate Artist
 Rolling Stone Editors’ Choice Awards 2009 kategori The Sensational Artist of the Year
 Artis Tersilet 2009 versi Silet RCTI
 Bintang Paling Berkilau 2009 versi tabloid Bintang Indonesia
 Bintang Indonesia 2009 versi tabloid Bintang Indonesia
 Aktris Layar Lebar Terfavorit 2009 versi responden DetEksi Jawa Pos

References

External links
 
  Luna Maya profile in eGosip.com
 

1983 births
Living people
People from Denpasar
Indo people
Javanese people
Indonesian people of Austrian descent
Indonesian female models
Indonesian film actresses
Indonesian television actresses
Indonesian television presenters
Indonesian women television presenters